The Thomas Crown Affair is either of two films:
 The Thomas Crown Affair (1968 film), a 1968 film starring Steve McQueen and Faye Dunaway
 The Thomas Crown Affair (1999 film), a 1999 remake of the 1968 film, starring Pierce Brosnan and Rene Russo